Sold Out is the debut studio album by DJ Paypal. It was released by Brainfeeder on November 13, 2015. It is a record in the Chicago footwork style of dance music.

Production
Paypal described it as intended to sound both beautiful and 'fucking hilarious' in an interview to Pitchfork: "Humor is the yin and yang that's missing from a lot of music. Either people take themselves way too seriously, or it's entirely a joke. I don't see it mixed together very often."

Critical reception

At Metacritic, which assigns a weighted average score out of 100 to reviews from mainstream critics, Sold Out received an average score of 77% based on 10 reviews, indicating "generally favorable reviews".

Colin Joyce of Spin wrote: "You'll get no closer to ascertaining his actual identity, but as the balance between jokes and earnest emoting narrows, Sold Out presents something of an abstract portrait of the man behind the haze." Ashley Hampson of Exclaim! described it as "an expansive take on footwork, incorporating expressive elements of soul, hip-hop and, most notably, jazz."

Paper included it on the "10 Most Underrated Albums of 2015" list. PopMatters placed it at number 17 on the "Best Electronic Music of 2015" list.

Track listing

Notes

References

External links
 
 

2015 debut albums
DJ Paypal albums
Brainfeeder albums